Joseph Mayseder (27 October 1789 – 21 November 1863) was an Austrian violin virtuoso and composer.

Biography
Mayseder showed musical promise from an early age, and was a student of Joseph Suche (1797), Paul Wranitzky (1798) and Ignaz Schuppanzigh. By the age of eleven, he was performing in public concerts at the Augarten in Vienna. He received lessons in composition from Emanuel Aloys Förster.

In 1810, he was appointed concertmaster of the Vienna Court Opera. In 1816, he was the violin soloist of the Hofburg Palace chapel orchestra, which he conducted from 1836. He was a major quartet player, as well as a teacher and composer for his instrument. Among his students were the highly esteemed Heinrich Wilhelm Ernst.

Mayseder was the recipient of multiple awards and honorary memberships. He was made an honorary citizen of Vienna in 1817.

He was buried in a grave of honour in the Central Cemetery in Vienna. The  in the Viennese  was named after him in 1876.

Selected works
Concert Music

Three Violin Concertos, op. 22, 26 and 28
 for violin and orchestra, op. 35 and op. 39
, op. 43
 for violin and orchestra or string quartet, op. 21, 27, 29 and 30
 for violin and orchestra or string quartet, op. 18, 23, 33, 40 (dedicated to Paganini) and 45

String quartets

Opus 5 in A major
Opus 6 in G minor
Opus 7 in A-flat major
Opus 8 in F major
Opus 9 in D major
Opus 23 in G major
Opus 62 in F-sharp minor
Opus 66 in D major
, with accompaniment of 2nd violin, viola and cello, op. 1, 4, 15

String quintets

Opus 50 in B minor
Opus 51 in A minor
Opus 55 in D major
Opus 65 in E-flat major
Opus 67 in E minor

Violin and piano

Sonata Opus 10
Sonata Opus 42

Piano trios

Opus 34 in E-flat major
Opus 41 in F major
Opus 51 in F major
Opus 52 in A-flat major
Opus 57 (Variations)
Opus 58 in E minor (1843)
Opus 59 in G major (1844)

Piano quartets

Opus 24 in F Minor
57  in D Major, opus 57
, opus 63

Church music
Mass in E-flat major, op. 64 (June 1848, Imperial Chapel of Vienna)

References

External links

1789 births
1863 deaths
Austrian male composers
Austrian composers
Austrian violinists
Male violinists
19th-century composers
19th-century Austrian people
Recipients of the Order of Franz Joseph
Burials at the Vienna Central Cemetery
19th-century male musicians
Musicians from Vienna